My Love from the Star is a South Korean fantasy romantic comedy television series written by Park Ji-eun and directed by Jang Tae-yoo. Produced by Choi Moon-suk and Moon Bo-mi, it stars Jun Ji-hyun, Kim Soo-hyun, Park Hae-jin, Yoo In-na, Shin Sung-rok, and Ahn Jae-hyun. It tells the story of an extraterrestrial alien who landed on Earth in 1609 during the Joseon Dynasty and 400 years later falls in love with a top female actor.

The series aired for 21 episodes on Seoul Broadcasting System (SBS) from December 18, 2013, to February 27, 2014. According to Nielsen Korea, it recorded an average nationwide television viewership rating of 24 percent. It garnered widespread popularity during its broadcast and sparked trends in fashion, make-up and restaurants. It has been also credited for spreading Korean wave.

My Love from the Star received several accolades. At the 50th Baeksang Arts Awards, it received nine nominations with three wins; Jun Ji-hyun won the Grand Prize – Television and Kim Soo-hyun won the Most Popular Actor – Television. The series won the Korea Drama Award for Best Drama, the Seoul International Drama Award for Excellent Korean Drama and the Magnolia Award for Best Foreign Television Series.

Synopsis
Do Min-joon (Kim Soo-hyun) is an alien who landed on Earth in 1609 during the Joseon Dynasty. He saves a girl named Seo Yi-hwa from falling off a cliff and misses his return trip to his home planet and is stranded on Earth for the next four centuries. He has a near-perfect human appearance, enhanced physical abilities involving his vision, hearing and speed, and a cynical, jaded view of human beings. Min-joon never ages and is forced to take on a new identity every ten years; he has worked as a doctor, an astronomer, a lawyer, and a banker, and is now working as a college professor.

Cheon Song-yi (Jun Ji-hyun) is a famous Hallyu actor who attained stardom as a schoolchild; her haughty demeanor has earned derision in the entertainment industry and on social media. Song-yi's spendthrift mother has mismanaged her finances and her younger brother Cheon Yoon-jae (Ahn Jae-hyun) is estranged by her success. Lee Hee-kyung (Park Hae-jin) has been Song-yi's friend since middle school and remains in love with her but is continually rejected. In turn, Yoo Se-mi (Yoo In-na), Song-yi's childhood friend who is frequently cast in a supporting role alongside Song-yi has had a crush on Hee-kyung since middle school despite her love being unrequited. As a result, Se-mi secretly harbors a deep jealousy towards Song-yi for standing in the way of her career and love interest.

With only three months left before Min-joon's long-awaited departure to his planet of origin, Song-yi suddenly becomes his next-door neighbor in the condominium where he lives. Slowly, Min-joon finds himself entangled in Song-yi's crazy and unpredictable situations, saving her multiple times using his special powers and eventually acting as her manager due to his vast legal knowledge. He finds out that she at a young age resembles Yi-hwa, with whom he fell in love with 400 years earlier. Min-joon and Song-yi eventually fall in love; Min-joon aims to leave Earth without being emotionally attached so he tries to avoid her but fails. While Song-yi initially does not understand his impending departure, she ultimately accepts letting him go to assure his survival.

Song-yi's career goes into a downturn when her talent agency and sponsors drop her in a backlash against her recent behavior, particularly rumors that she caused the suicide of her arch-rival, actor Han Yoo-ra. Earlier at a celebrity wedding, Song-yi had discovered Yoo-ra was in a secret relationship with Lee Jae-kyung (Shin Sung-rok), the elder brother of Hee-hyung. Jae-kyung tries to silence Song-yi until Min-joon brokers a deal to spare her in return for burying the evidence. Jae-kyung, however, turns out to be much more dangerous than Min-joon suspected, learning to exploit Min-joon's weaknesses and injuring Se-mi's older brother, a prosecutor who is investigating Yoo-ra's suicide. Min-joon, despite being discreet in the use of his special abilities, eventually draws the attention of police while losing control of his powers as his departure date nears. While jealous of Min-joon for winning Song-yi's heart, Hee-kyung works with Min-joon to protect her from Jae-kyung.

Cast

Main
 Jun Ji-hyun as Cheon Song-yi
 Kim Hyun-soo as young Cheon Song-yi / Seo Yi-hwa
 Kim Soo-hyun as Do Min-joon
 Park Hae-jin as Lee Hee-kyung
 Jo Seung-hyun as young Lee Hee-kyung
 Yoo In-na as Yoo Se-mi
 Kim Hye-won as young Yoo Se-mi

Supporting

Cheon Song-yi's family
 Na Young-hee as Yang Mi-yeon, Song-yi's mother
 Um Hyo-sup as Cheon Min-goo, Song-yi's father
 Ahn Jae-hyun as Cheon Yoon-jae, Song-yi's younger brother
Jeon Jin-seo as young Cheon Yoon-jae

People around Do Min-joon
 Kim Chang-wan as Jang Young-mok, Min-joon's lawyer who serves as a close confidant and "father figure"

Lee Hee-kyung's family
 Shin Sung-rok as Lee Jae-kyung, Hee-kyung's older brother
 Lee Jung-gil as Lee Beom-joong, Hee-kyung's father and the chairman of S&C Group
  as Hong Eun-ah, Hee-kyung's mother

Yoo Se-mi's family 
 Lee Il-hwa as Han Sun-young, Se-mi's mother
 Oh Sang-jin as Yoo Seok, Se-mi's older brother who is a prosecutor

People around Cheon Song-yi
 Hong Jin-kyung as Bok-ja, a comic book store owner and Song-yi's high school friend
 Jo Hee-bong as Ahn Dong-min, CEO of Song-yi's talent agency
 Kim Bo-mi as Min-ah, Song-yi's stylist
  as Yoon Bum, Song-yi's manager

Others

 Kim Hee-won as Park Byung-hee, a detective who works with Yoo Seok
 Lee Yi-kyung as Lee Shin, Jae-kyung's secretary
 Jo Se-ho as Cheol-soo, a patron of Bok-ja's comic book store who twists celebrity gossip and creates rumours
  as Hyuk, Cheol-soo's partner

Special appearances

 Yoo In-young as Han Yoo-ra, an actress and Cheon Song-yi's arch-rival 
 Yoo Jun-sang as Mr. Yoo, section chief at Lee Hee-kyung's workplace
 Park Jung-ah as Noh Seo-young, an actress
 Jang Hang-jun as Park Min-kyu, a director
 Son Eun-seo as Hwang Jin-yi, a kisaeng in the Joseon era
 Kim Soo-ro as Lee Hyung-wook, an auditor in Gangwon during Joseon era
 Jung Eun-pyo as Yoon Sung-dong, a Joseon realtor / Yoon Sung-dong's descendant in the present time
 Park Yeong-gyu as Heo Jun, a doctor in the Joseon era
 Bae Suzy as Go Hye-mi, Do Min-joon's student
 Yeon Woo-jin as Lee Han-kyung, Lee Hee-kyung's eldest brother
 Ryu Seung-ryong as Heo Gyun, a poet in the Joseon era
 Sandara Park as herself

Production
Developed under the working title Man from the Stars, My Love from the Star was written by Park Ji-eun. She based the drama on the historical Gwanghae Journal from the Veritable Records of the Joseon Dynasty that references mysterious UFO sightings. The series was directed by Jang Tae-yoo and the cinematography was handled by Lee Gil-bok and Jung Min-gyun. Produced by Choi Moon-suk and Moon Bo-mi,  managed the show's production.

In August 2013, media reported that Kim Soo-hyun and Jun Ji-hyun were cast in a fantasy rom-com; it is the second collaboration between Kim and Jun, coming after the successful film The Thieves (2012). It also marks Jun's small screen comeback after 14 years. Initially Park Hae-jin was cast to play Lee Jae-kyung, the antagonist, and Choi Min was cast to play his younger brother Lee Hee-kyung; but Choi Min's injury led to Park's role being changed to that of Lee Hee-kyung and Shin Sung-rok was cast as Lee Jae-kyung.

The first script reading was held on October 14, 2013, and filming began in early November 2013. The protagonist of the series possesses superpowers including the ability to teleport and stop time so special effects were needed. The crew used 60 small, special cameras to create bullet time effects. GoPro cameras were installed in a 180-degree arc and "stopped" characters were filmed from various angles. The final scene is a montage of small details and was enhanced digitally. This was the first time high-definition cameras were used to produce a television drama in South Korea.

Soundtrack

Album

My Love from the Star soundtrack album was released on February 26, 2014; it contains all of the singles and background tracks from the series. The album debuted on the weekly Gaon Album Chart at number four and was ranked seventy-one on the 2014 year-end Gaon Album Chart.

Tracklist

CD 2 is composed by Jeon Chang-yeop, Jin Myeongyong and Choe Changguk.

Chart performance

Singles
Singles included on the album were released from December 2013 to February 2014, and a special standalone single from the series, "Promise" (약속), sung by Kim Soo-hyun was released on March 13, 2014. Kim also contributed to the vocals of the soundtrack with "If I" (너의 집 앞; In Front of Your House); both of his covers were well-received by the audience. "Promise" reached the top of online music charts Soribada, Daum Music and Cyworld Music. All of the soundtrack's songs were popular across the Asia-Pacific region, including South Korea. Lyn's soundtrack single "My Destiny" peaked at number two on the Gaon Digital Chart and Billboards K-pop Hot 100. She later received the Best Original Soundtrack award at the 16th Mnet Asian Music Awards for the song. Hyolyn's "Goodbye" topped the Billboards K-pop Hot 100 chart for three consecutive weeks, making it the longest-running number one of January and February 2014.

Chart performance

Broadcast and viewership
My Love from the Star was originally broadcast on Seoul Broadcasting System (SBS)  on Wednesdays and Thursdays at 10:00 pm Korea Standard Time (KST); it was the most-watched television program of its time slot from December 18, 2013. Episode 14, which was supposed to air on January 30, 2014, was delayed and Secretly, Greatly starring Kim Soo-hyun was broadcast instead. A 70-minute special episode titled My Love from the Star: the Beginning was aired on February 7, 2014, at 11:20 pm KST; it recapped episodes 1 to 15, focusing on the love story of Do Min-joon and Cheon Song-yi. The program was aired 30 minutes ahead of its original time on February 12 due to coverage of the 2014 Winter Olympics but it still ranked as the most-watched program.

Although My Love from the Star was originally planned as a twenty-episode series, the production company decided to make an extra  episode due to demand from viewers. The 21-episode run finished its first run on February 27, 2014, with its highest nationwide rating of 28.1 percent, according to Nielsen Korea. A minute-long epilogue of the drama that shows happily newlywed couple Cheon Song-yi and Do Min-joon in a house with a garden was released on March 4.

International broadcast 
The show was premiered outside South Korea, during its official run on SBS, through online video platforms LeTV and iQIYI. It was one of the most-viewed streaming shows on iQIYI, where it was streamed more than 14.5 billion times from December 2013 to February 2014. Later, it was exported to nearly twenty countries. In the Philippines, it topped viewership ratings when it aired on GMA Network from April 21 to June 30, 2014, dubbed in Filipino. In China, My Love from the Star was aired with a different ending because of the government's censorship of materials that depict aliens and supernatural beings. Its broadcast on the Chinese television channel Anhui was concluded with the entire story being a fictional tale that Do Min-joon writes for Cheon Song-yi. The broadcasting rights has also been acquired by over-the-top content platforms like Viu, VIKI and Netflix, where it is available with multi-language subtitles.

Reception

My Love from the Star led to the resurgence of Korean wave (or "Hallyu") throughout Asia with reigniting it in China, and an increase in interest in the United States and North Korea. It was placed first as "Korea's most favorite program" in a poll conducted by Gallup Korea in February 2014, with 11.5 percent of the votes, replacing MBC's Infinite Challenge, which had held that position for the previous eleven months. Additionally, it was named the "most popular television program" of 2014 by CJ E&M and research firm AGB Nielsen Media Research.

Critical response
My Love from the Star largely received positive reviews from critics and viewers. In an op-ed piece published by the China Daily, writer Xiao Lixin attributed the program's success to "great innovations in South Korean TV productions in terms of themes and narrative patterns." He praised the plot as "logical and fast-paced", and interspersed with "whimsy and romantic punch lines", and write "high-speed photography and computer-generated effects" help "create a lifelike visual impact". Film and drama critic Greg Wheeler described it as "a silly, funny and surprisingly poignant drama, one that strips away the humour to lean in hard on the melodrama at just the right times. While the show is an outright romance first and foremost, it does have some great drama throughout too."

Lee Sang-hyun of Yonhap News Agency said the "power of the drama is also in the charm of the ... leading actors" and that "[i]t would have been difficult to gain convincing power for such an unrealistic setting and storytelling without Kim Soo-hyun's unique thick voice and stable acting ability". He also said Jun Ji-hyun's "acting tone" synchronised well with story development and that "[w]hen the comic melody with Do Min-joon reinforced, she showed a lovely appearance, and when a crisis came in the relationship, she stably conveyed sad emotions". Philippines Cosmopolitans Hanna Tamondong called the series as "iconic" and said that it will "send you dancing and laughing and crying because of Do Min-joon and Cheon Song-yi". Park Si-soo writing for The Korea Times said that "Shin Sung-rok was a scene stealer" and "his villain role gave the drama a new dimension".

A year-end poll that  Gallup conducted in South Korea named Kim Soo-hyun the "most memorable actor" of 2014, while Jun Ji-hyun was listed in third position.

Cultural impact
My Love from the Star became a cultural phenomenon in South Korea and China. The series started a craze for chimaek; Korean fried chicken (chicken) and maekju, a popular Korean snack of chicken and beer, which is the female protagonist's favourite snack. Despite declining chicken consumption in China due to fear of H7N9 bird flu, fried chicken restaurants in cities saw an increase in orders after the show was broadcast there. Korean instant noodle maker Nongshim said sales in January and February 2014―when the drama aired―rose to a record high in its more-than-15-year history of business in China, which was attributed to a scene in which the lead couple enjoyed a bowl of noodles on a trip.

The series influenced Korean fashion; clothes, accessories and make-up products worn by Jun Ji-hyun saw an "unprecedented" surge in orders. The children's novel The Miraculous Journey of Edward Tulane by Kate DiCamillo, from which the male protagonist repeatedly quotes throughout the series, went to the top of the bestseller lists in major Korean bookshops. A luggage manufacturing company also saw increased sales in China after Kim Soo-hyun carried one of its backpacks. The drama also drew the international community to the Korean language; "씨" (ssi), which Jun Ji-hyun adds after male protagonist's name, became the most-discussed word.

My Love from the Star attracted international tourism to South Korea and its filming locations became major attractions. Songdo rocky mountain in Incheon, where  Do Min-joon rescues Cheon Song-yi from a near-death experience, was developed into a tourist attraction by Incheon Development and Tourism Corporation. Among the filming locations were Dongdaemun Design Plaza & Park (DDP) and Boutique Monaco; newly built luxury buildings. The Korea Tourism Organization held a 3D exhibit at the DDP Art Hall that featured one of the show's house sets with display rooms titled "Start," "Fate," "Shaking" and "Longing" in line with the plot, from June 10, to August 15, 2014.
Other locations that attracted tourists include Incheon National University—one of the major shooting locations— and the French-themed village Petite France in Gapyeong, Gyeonggi, where Do Min-joon and Cheon Song-yi share a kiss.

In March 2014, The Washington Post reported My Love from the Star popularity had led to it being discussed at China's National People's Congress, particularly in a committee of the political advisory body Chinese People's Political Consultative Conference (CPPCC), where it reportedly topped the agenda among delegates from the culture and entertainment industry.

Awards and nominations

My Love from the Star cast and crew won numerous awards, both in South Korea and internationally. The series won the Best Drama Award at the 7th Korea Drama Awards, the Top Excellence Korean Drama Award at the 9th Seoul International Drama Awards, Magnolia Award for Best Foreign Television Series at the 20th Shanghai Television Festival, and the Best Foreign Drama Award at the 8th International Drama Festival in Tokyo. It was nominated at the 50th Baeksang Arts Awards in nine television categories including Best Drama, Best Director and Best Screenplay. Jun Ji-hyun won the Grand Prize – Television and Kim Soo-hyun won the Most Popular Actor – Television at the ceremony. Jun also won the Grand Prize at the 22nd SBS Drama Awards while Kim Soo-hyun earned the notch at the 7th Korea Drama Awards. Kim Soo-hyun also won the Best Actor in Asia Award at the 8th International Drama Festival in Tokyo.

Adaptations
Due to its popularity in mainland China, Chinese production company Meng Jiang Wei re-edited the series into a two-hour, feature-length film that was released in theatres in August 2014.

In September 2014, it was announced an American remake was under development at American Broadcasting Company; it was to be written by Elizabeth Craft and Sarah Fain, and produced by HB Entertainment and EnterMedia Contents in association with Sony Pictures Television. However, due to unknown reasons, the remake was shelved.

In 2017, a Philippine remake of the same title, which was directed by Joyce Bernal, was broadcast on GMA Network. The rights for the production were acquired by GMA-7 in 2016. Jennylyn Mercado was cast as Cheon Song-yi, who was renamed Steffi Cheon; and Filipino-Spanish model and first-time actor Gil Cuerva was cast for the role of Do Min-joon, who was renamed Matteo Do. After the premiere of its first episode on May 29, 2017, the hashtag "#MyLoveFromTheStarPH" was the most-popular Twitter hashtag in the Philippines and at number two worldwide.

A Thai remake, titled  was broadcast in Thailand in the second half of 2019 by Channel 3; it stars  Nadech Kugimiya and Peranee Kongthai, and achieved low ratings.

A Japanese remake was released on Amazon Prime on February 23, 2022, starring Mizuki Yamamoto and Sota Fukushi

Plagiarism suit
In a statement posted on her blog on December 20, 2013, author Kang Kyung-ok alleged the concept of My Love from the Star was plagiarized from her 2008 comic book Seol-hee, claiming the background, setup, jobs and relationships between characters were similar. The production company HB Entertainment denied plagiarism  in an official statement, calling the claim "completely baseless". The company said; "the two works may look similar as they both take a motif from the Gwanghae Journal in the Veritable Records of the Joseon Dynasty". The show's screenwriter Park Ji-eun said she "had never read or heard of" Seol-hee.

HB Entertainment said it was prepared to "strongly confront" the lawsuit with its own evidence and witnesses, calling the charges of plagiarism "synonymous to a death sentence" for creators that must be "eradicated". Kang dropped her lawsuit on July 3, 2014, after an out-of-court settlement.

In April 2014, Indonesian television network RCTI aired a series titled , which was first thought to be an authorised remake of My Love from the Star but was then found to have been plagiarized. The Indonesian series has exactly the same set up and storyline as the Korean drama. A representative of SBS Contents Hub stated: "The drama was created without the obtainment of legal publication rights. You could view it as plagiarism ... While we were in the process of discussing the sale of legal publication rights with another Indonesian enterprise, this drama came out. We are in the midst of finding what course of action to take." Broadcast of the series was discontinued but after an agreement between RCTI and SBS, it began airing again in June 2014.

Notes

References

External links
  
 My Love from the Star at SBS International
 
 
 
 My Love from the Star on Viki

2013 South Korean television series debuts
2014 South Korean television series endings
Korean-language television shows
South Korean romantic comedy television series
South Korean fantasy television series
South Korean television series remade in other languages
Seoul Broadcasting System television dramas
Television series by HB Entertainment
Television shows written by Park Ji-eun
Television shows involved in plagiarism controversies